The Third Army was a field army of the Army of the Kingdom of Serbia that fought during the Balkan Wars and World War I.

History

First Balkan War
During the First Balkan War, the Third Army participated in the Battle of Kumanovo (23 - October 24, 1912) along with the Serbian First Army and the Serbian Second Army. It was composed of four infantry divisions and one infantry brigade (76,000 men), deployed in two groups, the first one at Toplica and the second one at Medveđa. It was assigned to the westernmost attack, with the task of taking Kosovo and then moving south to attack the left flank of the Ottoman Army.

World War I  

In World War I, the Third Army fought in the successful Battles of Cer, Drina and Kolubra in 1914. But in Autumn 1915 they were defeated by the Bulgarians and Germans during the Kosovo Offensive.
The Third Army was reestablished at the Macedonian front in 1916 and fought several battles against the Bulgarians, until it was disbanded on 28 March 1917.   
 
Pavle Jurišić Šturm remained commander of the Third Army until August 1916, when he was replaced by Miloš Vasić.

Organization

First Balkan War

World War I : August 1914

Commander : Pavle Jurišić Šturm

See also
First Army (Serbia)
Second Army (Serbia)

References and notes

Field armies of Serbia
Military units and formations of Serbia in World War I
Serbia in World War I
Military units and formations established in 1912
1912 establishments in Serbia